Calvin Bernard Jackson (October 28, 1972 – March 15, 2021) was an American professional football player who was a defensive back for the Miami Dolphins in the National Football League (NFL).  Born in Miami, he was signed by the Dolphins as an undrafted free agent in 1994. He played college football for the Auburn Tigers. 

Jackson died on March 15, 2021.

References

1972 births
2021 deaths
American football cornerbacks
American football safeties
Auburn Tigers football players
Place of death missing
Miami Dolphins players
Birmingham Thunderbolts players
Players of American football from Miami